Dwayne Washington (born April 24, 1994) is an American football running back for the New Orleans Saints of the National Football League (NFL). He played college football at Washington. He was drafted by the Detroit Lions in the seventh round of the 2016 NFL Draft.

Early years
Washington attended and played high school football at Gahr High School in Cerritos, California.

College career
Washington played for the University of Washington from 2012 to 2015. Washington redshirted in his first year with the program. In the 2013 season, he had 47 rushing attempts for 332 yards and four touchdowns. In addition, he made one five-yard touchdown reception. In the 2014 season, he had 132 rushing attempts for 697 yards and nine touchdowns. In addition, he had 15 receptions for 91 yards. He played in nine games for the Washington Huskies during the 2015 season, rushing for 282 yards on 47 carries and catching 25 passes for another 315 yards and three touchdowns. He missed the final four games of the season, including the team's bowl game, due to a knee injury.

Collegiate statistics

Professional career

Detroit Lions
Washington was drafted in the seventh round with the 236th overall pick by the Detroit Lions in the 2016 NFL Draft. Overall, in his rookie season, he finished with 90 carries for 265 rushing yards and a rushing touchdown. In the 2017 season, he recorded 20 carries for 44 yards.

On September 1, 2018, Washington was waived by the Lions.

New Orleans Saints

On September 2, 2018, Washington was signed to the New Orleans Saints' practice squad. He was promoted to the active roster on September 28, 2018. He recorded 27 carries for 154 rushing yards in 13 games on the 2018 season, a majority which came against the Carolina Panthers in Week 17. Overall, in the 2019 season, he recorded eight carries for 60 rushing yards.

Washington re-signed with the Saints on April 16, 2020. He was placed on the reserve/COVID-19 list by the team on August 30, 2020. He was activated on September 17, 2020. He was placed back on the COVID-19 list on January 2, 2021, and activated on January 6.

On March 10, 2021, Washington signed a one-year contract extension with the Saints.

On April 18, 2022, Washington signed another one-year contract with the Saints.

References

External links
 New Orleans Saints bio
 Washington Huskies bio

1994 births
Living people
People from Lakewood, California
Players of American football from California
Sportspeople from Los Angeles County, California
American football running backs
Washington Huskies football players
Detroit Lions players
New Orleans Saints players